Kyllinga brevifolia is a species of sedge known by several common names, including shortleaf spikesedge, green kyllinga, perennial greenhead sedge, and kyllinga weed. It is native to tropical areas in the Americas but it can be found in warm regions around the world where it is an introduced species. This is a rhizomatous perennial herb growing one to several erect stems to heights up to about half a meter, often much shorter. It produces tiny inflorescences of a few spikelets each which in total are less than a centimeter long. Pollens are tiny, approximately 20-30 microns in size. It is sometimes a weed in wet areas such as cultivated land and irrigation ditches.

References

External links
Jepson Manual Treatment
Photo gallery

brevifolia
Plants described in 1773
Taxa named by Christen Friis Rottbøll